Helge Brattebø is a Norwegian chartered engineer. He is a professor of industrial ecology at the Norwegian University of Science and Technology.

He is an editor of the Journal of Industrial Ecology, and a councillor for the International Society for Industrial Ecology.

References

External links
Brattebø’s employee site at NTNU
Website of Industrial Ecology Programme (IndEcol) at NTNU

Living people
Norwegian engineers
Norwegian University of Science and Technology alumni
Members of the Norwegian Academy of Technological Sciences
People from Voss
Year of birth missing (living people)